The 1990 Ms. Olympia contest was an IFBB professional bodybuilding competition was held on November 24, 1990, in New York City, New York. It was the 11th Ms. Olympia competition held.

Results

Notable Events
 This Ms. Olympia competition had 30 competitors attending, the most competitors attending a Ms. Olympia ever.

See also
 1990 Mr. Olympia

References

 Ms Olympia
 1990 Ms. Olympia held in New York on November 24th
 1990 Ms Olympia Results

External links
 Competitor History of the Ms. Olympia

Ms. Olympia
Ms. Olympia
1990s in Manhattan
Ms. Olympia
History of female bodybuilding
Sports in Manhattan
Ms. Olympia